The mayor of South Taranaki officiates over the South Taranaki District of New Zealand's North Island.

History

The South Taranaki District was formed in the 1989 local government reforms. Pierce Joyce was the first mayor until he was beaten in the 1992 local elections by Mary Bourke. Bourke retired at the 2007 local elections and was replaced by Ross Dunlop. Phil Nixon is the current mayor of South Taranaki. He won the mayoral election by a large margin in October 2019 after Dunlop did not seek re-election.

List of mayors of South Taranaki
South Taranaki has had four mayors:

References

South Taranaki
 
South Taranaki District